Justice Whittle may refer to:

Kennon C. Whittle, associate justice of the Supreme Court of Virginia
Stafford G. Whittle, associate justice of the Supreme Court of Virginia